Postoperative hematomas are a cutaneous condition characterized by a collection of blood below the skin, and result as a complication following surgery.

See also 
 Subungual hematoma
 List of cutaneous conditions

References 

Skin conditions resulting from physical factors